Flying Tiger Line, also known as Flying Tigers, was the first scheduled cargo airline in the United States and a major military charter operator during the Cold War era for both cargo and personnel (the latter with leased aircraft). The airline was bought by Federal Express in 1988.

History 

The company was started by Robert William Prescott. It was headquartered on the grounds of Los Angeles International Airport in Westchester, Los Angeles, California.

The airline was named after the Flying Tigers fighter unit of World War II, officially the 1st American Volunteer Group. Ten former AVG pilots, after returning to the United States in 1945, formed the Flying Tiger Line established on 24 June 1945 as National Freight Service known under the name of  National Skyway Freight using a small fleet of 14 Budd Conestoga freighters purchased as war surplus from the United States Navy. The pilots and two ground crew provided half of the initial investment, with the balance coming from California oil tycoon Samuel B. Mosher. For the next four years, Flying Tiger Line carried air freight on contract throughout the U.S. and, as the airline expanded, carrying supplies to U.S. troops under Gen. Douglas MacArthur during the occupation of Japan.

In 1949, the Civil Aeronautics Board awarded Flying Tiger Line the first commercial air cargo route in the U.S., a transcontinental route from Los Angeles and San Francisco, California to Boston, Massachusetts. Shortly afterward, the company began chartering passenger aircraft for group travel as well; its Lockheed Super Constellation, Douglas DC-4 and DC-6 fleet comprised the largest trans-Atlantic charter operation through the 1950s.

Operations
During the Korean War, Flying Tiger aircraft were chartered to transport troops and supplies from the United States to Asia; Flying Tigers later received a cargo route award to Japan, China, and Southeast Asia. The airline also played a major role in the construction of the Distant Early Warning Line, flying equipment to remote outposts in northern Canada and Alaska.

Flying Tiger Line adopted the Canadair CL-44 swing-tail aircraft in 1961, becoming one of the first carriers in the world to offer aerial pallet shipping service. In 1965, Flying Tiger Line began operating jet aircraft when on September, 27, the first (as N322F) of four Boeing 707 was delivered. The Boeing 707 remained in the fleet only few years, and later sold, upon arrival of the higher-payload Douglas DC-8, the largest civilian airliner until the Boeing 747 entered service. The first Douglas DC-8-63F registered as N779FT was delivered to the airline on June 26, 1968 and the other eighteen followed until 1972.

In 1974, the airline took delivery of its first Boeing 747. Aircraft loaders had earlier refused to work at the extreme  height necessary for loading freight on the upper deck, so the "supernumerary area" or "hump" was configured with 19 first class seats instead which were used to transport livestock handlers, charter agents and mechanics as well as dead-heading pilots and flight attendants.

Tiger's Ad Hoc Charter livestock flights provided airlift for exotic animals. Two examples were thoroughbred racehorses and show animals from Stansted, England to the Melbourne Cup, as well as breeding stock cattle (milk supply) to nations such as Japan and Thailand. They became known for carrying a number of unique cargoes, including Shamu the SeaWorld killer whale and the torch of the Statue of Liberty.

By the mid-1980s, Flying Tigers operated scheduled cargo service to six continents and served 58 countries. It surpassed Pan American World Airways in 1980 as the world's largest air cargo carrier after acquiring its rival cargo airline Seaboard World Airlines on 1 October 1980. It also operated military contract services, most notably DC-8 routes between Travis Air Force Base, California and Japan in the 1970s, followed by weekly 747 passenger service between Clark Air Base, Philippines, and St. Louis, Missouri via Japan, Alaska, and Los Angeles during the 1980s. Covert flights for the military were not uncommon throughout the airline's history, given its roots in Civil Air Transport (CAT), as with its sister airline Air America, originally owned by General Claire Lee Chennault, commander of the Flying Tigers fighter squadron in Southeast Asia.

At its peak, the Tigers employed approximately 251 flight attendants and carried up to a record 594 passengers and crew on its MAC all-coach passenger flights. Approximately 998 pilots worked for the airline based throughout the US. Large crew bases were situated at Los Angeles, New York City and Lockbourne, Ohio (Rickenbacker International Airport). The Los Angeles headquarters operation included its own engine shop and jet maintenance business. Flying Tigers also made livestock carriers for airplanes, some comparable in external size and shape to the standard AMJ container used in the FedEx flight operations. They operated a recording company subsidiary, Happy Tiger Records, from 1969 to 1971.

Charter and scheduled passenger operations were flown by their subsidiary, Metro International Airlines, which was formed in January 1981, and ceased operations in 1983, when it was sold to Tower Air. The scheduled Boeing 747 passenger service route was New York City JFK Airport - Brussels - Tel Aviv operated several days a week.

After airline deregulation, stiff competition buffeted profits and, with some unsuccessful diversification attempts by parent Tiger International, the airline began sustaining losses in 1981. Then-CEO Stephen Wolf sold Flying Tigers to Federal Express in December 1988. On August 7, 1989, Federal Express merged Flying Tigers into its operations.

World record
On 15 November 1965, a modified Flying Tigers Boeing 707-349C made the first ever aerial circumnavigation of the Earth via the poles, in 62 hours 27 minutes.  The aircraft carried additional fuel in two additional tanks installed in the main cabin.

Fleet 

At the time of its sale to FedEx, Flying Tigers were operating the following aircraft:

8 Boeing 747-100
13 Boeing 747-200
19 Boeing 727-100
6 Douglas DC-8-73

Accidents and incidents
More details of the following can be found at the ASN Aviation Safety Database
 On July 30, 1950, a Flying Tiger Line Curtiss C-46 (N67960), crashed on takeoff from Stapleton International Airport due to unknown performance problems; both pilots and both passengers survived, but the aircraft was written off.
 On January 7, 1953, Flying Tiger Line Flight 841, a Douglas C-54 (N86574), struck the base of Squak Mountain due to pilot error, killing all seven on board. The aircraft was being ferried from Burbank to Seattle.
 On September 24, 1955, Flying Tiger Line Flight 7413/23, a Douglas C-54 (N90433), ditched in the Pacific after three engines failed, killing three of five crew.
 On March 18, 1956, a Flying Tiger Line Curtiss C-46 (N9995F), crashed at Pelly Bay, Canada after the left wing struck terrain while on a VFR approach, both pilots and the passenger survived, but the aircraft was written off.
 On September 9, 1958, a Flying Tiger Line L-1049H Super Constellation (N6920C) struck Mount Ōyama while operating a Travis AFB-Tokyo cargo flight, killing all eight on board.
 On March 15, 1962, Flying Tiger Line Flight 7816/14, an L-1049H Super Constellation (N6911C), crashed on approach to Adak Island Naval Air Station, Alaska due to pilot error, killing one of eight on board. The aircraft was operating a Military Air Transport Service (MATS) cargo flight from Travis AFB to Kadena Air Base.
 On March 16, 1962, Flying Tiger Line Flight 739 (also known as Flight 7815/13) disappeared over the Pacific with 107 on board. This accident remains the worst ever accident involving the L-1049.
 On September 23, 1962, Flying Tiger Line Flight 923, an L-1049H Super Constellation (N6923C), ditched in the North Atlantic after three engines failed, killing 28 of 76 on board. The aircraft was operating a MATS charter flight from Gander to Frankfurt.
 On December 14, 1962, Flying Tiger Line Flight 183, an L-1049H Super Constellation (N6913C), crashed on approach to Lockheed Air Terminal in Burbank due to pilot incapacitation (suspected heart attack), killing all five on board and three on the ground.
 On December 24, 1964, Flying Tiger Line Flight 282 crashed near San Francisco International Airport after an unexplained course change, killing the three crew.
 On December 15, 1965, Flying Tiger Line Flight 914, an L-1049H Super Constellation (N6914C), struck California Peak after the pilot became disorientated in IFR conditions, killing the three crew.
 On March 21, 1966, Flying Tiger Line Flight 6303, a Canadair CL-44 (N453T), crashed on landing at NAS Norfolk due to pilot error; all six crew survived, but the aircraft was written off.
 On December 24, 1966, a Flying Tiger Line Canadair CL-44 (N228SW) crashed on landing near Da Nang, killing all four crew and 107 on the ground.
 On July 27, 1970, Flying Tiger Line Flight 45, a Douglas DC-8 (N785FT), crashed in the water off Naha Air Base, Okinawa, killing all four crew.
 On February 15, 1979, Flying Tiger Line Flight 74, a Boeing 747 (N804FT), was landing at O’Hare International Airport in heavy fog whilst Delta Airlines Flight 349, a Boeing 727, was crossing the active runway Flight 74 was landing on. The two aircraft narrowly avoided a ground collision when Flight 74 swerved into the grass beside the runway. No one was injured, and the aircraft was returned to service.
 On October 11, 1983, Flying Tiger Line Flight 9014, a Boeing 747 (N806FT), ran off the runway at Frankfurt International Airport after a cargo pallet broke loose; the three crew and three passengers survived; the aircraft was substantially damaged, but was repaired and returned to service.
 On October 25, 1983, Flying Tiger Line Flight 2468, a Douglas DC-8 (N797FT), ran off the runway at NAS Norfolk due to crew and ATC errors; all five on board survived; the aircraft was substantially damaged but was repaired and returned to service.
 On February 19, 1989, Flying Tiger Line Flight 66 crashed near Kuala Lumpur due to crew and ATC errors, killing all four crew.

See also 
 List of defunct airlines of the United States

References

External links 

Flying Tiger Line accidents and incidents at the Aviation Safety Network
Flying Tiger Line photo gallery
Flying Tiger Line Pilots Association
Flying Tigers Boeing 747 Fleet Detail 
Annals of the Flying Tigers

 
Defunct airlines of the United States
Defunct cargo airlines
FedEx
Airlines established in 1945
Airlines disestablished in 1989
American companies established in 1945
Cargo airlines of the United States